Adeline van Lier (born 19 November 1956, at The Hague) is a Dutch television and radio presenter, currently working for the KRO. She studied graphic design and typography in The Hague, and then began working in theater. Her television debut was alongside IJf Blokker, for the VPRO program Puur natuur. Since 2006 she presents Nacht van het Goede Leven on Radio 1.

Her father  (1916–1992), was a member of the Dutch resistance during World War II. After the war he was politician of the Labour Party (PvdA).

External links

Biography on KRO
Biography on Beeld en Geluid Wiki

Living people
1956 births
Dutch radio presenters
Dutch women radio presenters
Dutch television presenters
Dutch women television presenters
Mass media people from The Hague
20th-century Dutch women
21st-century Dutch women